Forest Grove, Pennsylvania may refer to:
Forest Grove, Allegheny County, Pennsylvania
Forest Grove, Bucks County, Pennsylvania